Zola is a 2020 American black comedy crime film directed by Janicza Bravo and written by Bravo and Jeremy O. Harris. It is based on a viral Twitter thread from 2015 by Aziah "Zola" King and the resulting Rolling Stone article "Zola Tells All: The Real Story Behind the Greatest Stripper Saga Ever Tweeted" by David Kushner. It stars Taylour Paige as Zola, a part-time stripper who is convinced by her new friend (Riley Keough) to travel to Tampa, Florida, in order to earn money, only to get in over her head; Colman Domingo, Nicholas Braun, and Ari'el Stachel also star.

The film had its world premiere at the Sundance Film Festival on January 24, 2020, and was released in the United States on June 30, 2021, by A24, following a year delay due to the COVID-19 pandemic. Zola received positive reviews from critics and earned nominations at numerous awards shows, including a leading seven nods at the 37th Independent Spirit Awards, among them Best Film, Best Director, and Best Screenplay with two wins for Best Female Lead for Paige and Best Editing for Joi McMillon.

Plot
Aziah "Zola" King, a self-assured waitress and part-time stripper in Detroit, meets Stefani, an outgoing and crass fellow stripper, while serving her at work. Stefani invites Zola to dance with her at a club that night, and the two become friends. The next day, Stefani proposes that Zola join her on a road trip to Tampa, Florida, the location of a strip club where Stefani claims the two can make significant money. Zola joins Stefani; her mysterious roommate, X; and Stefani's dimwitted boyfriend, Derrek, on a road trip.

Upon arriving in Tampa, Stefani, Zola, and X leave Derrek at a seedy motel while they visit the club where Stefani claims her friends earned over $5,000 in one night. The two perform at the club, but do not net nearly as much as Stefani insisted they would. After, Zola learns that Stefani and X have posted photos of her and Stefani in a Backpage advertisement, selling them for sex. Zola attempts to leave, but is threatened by X, who reveals himself to be Stefani's pimp.

X brings the women to an upscale hotel, where Stefani proceeds to have sex with a male client. Zola, who does not wish to participate, is incredulous when she learns that X is charging only $150 per client. Zola edits the Backpage advertisement, changing the rate to $500 to help Stefani earn more money; by the end of the night, Stefani has made over $8,000. X is initially insulted by Zola's intervention, but quickly grows impressed. Meanwhile, Derrek, left to his own devices, befriends a man named Dion whom he meets at the motel. When X, Stefani, and Zola return to the motel, X is enraged to discover that Derrek informed Dion about their reason for visiting Tampa. Worried that Dion and his associates will rob them, X forces the group to flee.

After arriving at another hotel, X arranges for Stefani to see more clients at various locations, while a reluctant Zola stands by to ensure Stefani's safety. When Derrek realizes Stefani is again engaging in prostitution, he argues with her, revealing to Zola that Stefani has manipulated other dancers into unwittingly participating in similar prostitution rackets. Zola is angered and loses all trust in Stefani. Derrek and Stefani's quarreling is interrupted when X bursts in with Baybe, his lover and madam, who is armed with a gun. After calming the situation, X gives Zola a gun for the women's protection, and Stefani and Zola are sent out so Stefani can continue to meet with clients.

After Stefani engages in a gang bang at a private residence, the two women visit another hotel, where a client has responded to their Backpage ad. Upon opening the hotel room door, Stefani is grabbed by the client and forced into the room. A terrified Zola flees and calls X and Derrek on her phone. The three return to the room and find the men inside are Dion and an accomplice, armed with shotguns, who have posed as clients in order to rob Stefani of her earnings. At gunpoint, X offers the men $50,000, along with possession of Zola, if they let him and Derrek leave with Stefani, who has been beaten unconscious. As Zola is digitally penetrated against her will by Dion, X manages to draw the gun Zola has in her purse, then shoots Dion in the throat. The group flee the hotel, disposing of Dion's guns by throwing them into the Tampa Bay.

The group eventually arrives at a large, luxurious home X shares with Baybe. X finally allows Zola to leave and proclaims his possession of Stefani, but Derrek threatens to commit suicide should Stefani remain loyal to X. Derrek immediately throws himself over a balcony, landing on concrete below and injuring his head. Zola, Stefani, and X leave to take Derrek to the hospital. In the car, Stefani proclaims her love for Zola, but is met with cool disgust as an exhausted Zola looks out the window and ignores her.

Cast

Production
In October 2015, Detroit waitress Aziah "Zola" King posted a 148-tweet thread about a trip she took to Florida with a stripper named Jessica; the story, containing details of prostitution, murder and an attempted suicide, quickly went viral, garnering the recognition of people such as Missy Elliott, Solange Knowles and Ava DuVernay. About a month later, Rolling Stones David Kushner published an article interviewing people involved in the story; while the article noted several inconsistencies in the stories, and King has admitted to embellishing some of the more sensational details, most of the involved have admitted to the general gist of the story.

In February 2016, it was announced James Franco would direct the film, from a screenplay by Andrew Neel and Mike Roberts. Franco, Vince Jolivette, Christine Vachon, David Hinojosa, and Kara Baker would serve as producers on the film, under their Rabbit Bandini Productions, Killer Films and Gigi Films banners, respectively. In January 2018, it was announced the film was initially set to begin production in February 2018, but was shelved following sexual misconduct allegations against Franco. In June 2018, it was announced Janicza Bravo would direct the film, replacing Franco, while A24 would distribute. In October 2018, Taylour Paige was cast in the film to play the lead role. That same month, Riley Keough, Nicholas Braun, Colman Domingo, and Jason Mitchell joined the cast of the film. In November 2018, Ari'el Stachel joined the cast.

Principal photography began on October 29, 2018. The entire film was shot in 27 days. Production concluded on December 7, 2018.

Release
The film had its world premiere at the Sundance Film Festival on January 24, 2020, where it was nominated for the Grand Jury Awards pre-screening. Sony Pictures Releasing, under the Stage 6 Films banner, acquired the international rights (excluding Canada and Japan) to the film. It was released in the United States on June 30, 2021.

Reception

Box office 
In the United States and Canada, Zola was projected to gross $2–4 million from 1,468 theaters in its opening weekend. The film made $505,000 on its first day of release and $282,000 on its second. It went on to debut to $1.2 million in its opening weekend and $2 million over the five-day frame, finishing ninth at the box office. The film fell 48% to $620,000 in its second weekend, finishing in 10th.

Critical response 
The site's critical consensus reads, "Zola captures the stranger-than-fiction appeal of the viral Twitter thread that inspired it – and announces director/co-writer Janicza Bravo as a filmmaker to watch." On Metacritic, the film has a weighted average score of 76 out of 100, based on 46 critics, indicating "generally favorable reviews". PostTrak reported that 68% of audience members gave Zola positive score, with 46% saying they would definitely recommend it.

Writing for The A.V. Club, Shannon Miller gave the film a grade of "B" and said: "Zola is first and foremost a zany, catastrophic road-trip dramedy, one that balances the whimsy of social media with the harrowing reality of being trapped in a dangerous situation." Critic Owen Gleiberman of Variety called Zola "a true story so extravagant it feels like it must have been made up. It's a mini volcano of sex and violence and danger and deception. It's a close-to-the-bone portrait of women who work in the sex industry. It's a youthquake as real as American Honey. It's a piece of pure filmmaking bravura."

Peter Debruge, also writing for Variety, praised the "virtuoso filmmaking and a pair of killer performances" but wrote: "Sure, it's fun to see a movie skewer the vapid soullessness of social media and the unregulated economy of male desire, but Zola ultimately rings hollow. The actors are fearless, and yet, how much do we know about these characters in the end? The answer: something of their values, but almost nothing of their lives." Writing for The Face, Ludwig Hurtado said the film was part of a genre he termed "Tampa-core," which he described as presenting a "hyper-stylised vision of Florida" with "all the violence and drama of a classic western"; he included Waves and Spring Breakers as comparable titles.

Accolades

References

External links
 
 
 
 Official screenplay

2020 films
2020 biographical drama films
2020 black comedy films
2020s road comedy-drama films
A24 (company) films
American biographical drama films
American road comedy-drama films
Comedy films based on actual events
Films about prostitution in the United States
Films about striptease
Films based on Internet-based works
Films about social media
Films based on newspaper and magazine articles
Films produced by Christine Vachon
Films set in Tampa, Florida
Films shot in Florida
Killer Films films
American female buddy films
Films about rape in the United States
2020s female buddy films
2020s English-language films
2020s American films
American independent films
2020 independent films